Tesse may refer to:

People
Madame de Tessé, a French salon holder and letter writer
Manuela Tesse, an Italian footballer 
René de Froulay de Tessé, a French soldier and diplomat during the reign of Louis XIV

Places
Tesse, a lake in Lom municipality in Innlandet county, Norway
Tessé-Froulay, a commune in the Orne department in northwestern France

Other
Tessé Sandstones, a geologic formation in France